Edward Pruen Cordner (31 January 1919 – 4 March 1996) was an Australian rules footballer who played with Melbourne in the Victorian Football League (VFL) during the 1940s.

Family
The older brother of Melbourne Team of the Century members Denis and Don Cordner, Ted would have played more than 52 games had he not pursued a medical career. His youngest brother was John.

He married Elizabeth Anne Baillieu on 4 December 1951.

Football
Cordner joined the club in 1941 and was a member of their premiership winning side. He missed the entire 1944 and 1945 seasons due to him being busy serving as a naval doctor but managed to play 19 games in 1946 as well as representing Victoria in an interstate match.

Footnotes

References
Holmesby, Russell and Main, Jim (2007). The Encyclopedia of AFL Footballers. 7th ed. Melbourne: Bas Publishing.

External links

 Ted Cordner, at Demonwiki.

1919 births
VFL/AFL players born outside Australia
Australian rules footballers from Melbourne
Melbourne Football Club players
University Blacks Football Club players
1996 deaths
Melbourne Football Club Premiership players
One-time VFL/AFL Premiership players
People from Diamond Creek, Victoria
Royal Australian Navy personnel of World War II
Medical doctors from Melbourne
Military personnel from Melbourne